is a city in Toyama Prefecture, in the Chūbu region of Japan. , the city had an estimated population of 41,564 in 15,387 households and a population density of 95.8 persons per km².

Geography
Kurobe is located in northeastern of Toyama Prefecture, with a topography ranging from sea level at Toyama Bay to the 3000 meter mountains of the Northern Alps on the border with Nagano Prefecture. The Kurobe River flows through the city. Kurobe has a humid continental climate (Köppen Cfa) characterized by mild summers and cold winters with heavy snowfall. The average annual temperature in Kurobe is 13.7 °C. The average annual rainfall is 2277 mm with September as the wettest month. The temperatures are highest on average in August, at around 26.2 °C, and lowest in January, at around 2.6 °C.

Surrounding municipalities
Toyama Prefecture
 Asahi
 Nyūzen
 Kamiichi
Nagano Prefecture
 Omachi
 Hakuba

Demographics
Per Japanese census data, the population of Kurobe has remained relatively steady over the past 50 years.

History
The area is home to the Aimotohimesha Shrine and also shares its name with Kurobe River, both of which form a central element in the local legend of a powerful serpent of Kurobe River. 

The area of present-day Kurobe was part of ancient Etchū Province. The towns of Ikuji and Mikkaichi were created on April 1, 1889 with the establishment of the municipalities system. On April 1, 1954, the town of Ikuji merged with the town of Sakurai to form the city of Kurobe.

On March 31, 2006 the town of Unazuki (from Shimoniikawa District) was merged into Kurobe.

Government
Kurobe has a mayor-council form of government with a directly elected mayor and a unicameral city legislature of 18 members.

Economy
Kurobe is the world headquarters of YKK.

Education
Kurobe has nine public elementary schools and four public junior high schools. The city has one public high school operated by the Toyama Prefectural Board of Education. The prefecture also operates one special education school.

Transportation

Railway
West Japan Railway Company (JR West)  – Hokuriku Shinkansen
  
  Ainokaze Toyama Railway 
  - 
 Toyama Chihō Railway
 -  -  -  -  -  -  -  -   -  -  -  -  -  -   - 
Kurobe Gorge Railway

Highway

International relations
 - Sneek, Friesland, Netherlands, since September 10, 1970
 - Macon-Bibb, Georgia, United States, since May 10, 1977
 – Samcheok, Korea, friendship city

Local attractions
Kurobe Gorge
Unazuki Onsen

Notable people from Kurobe
Susumu Kurobe, actor
Mitsuhiro Miyakoshi, politician

References

External links

  
  
Kurobe Unazuki-onsen Tourist Board

 
Cities in Toyama Prefecture
Populated coastal places in Japan